Uwe Schneider (born 28 August 1971) is a German former footballer. Since 2008 he works as an athletic director for FC 08 Villingen.

Honours
VfB Stuttgart
 Bundesliga: 1991–92

References

1971 births
Living people
German footballers
Germany under-21 international footballers
VfB Stuttgart players
VfB Stuttgart II players
VfL Bochum players
Hannover 96 players
1. FC Nürnberg players
Eintracht Frankfurt players
VfR Aalen players
Zagłębie Lubin players
Bundesliga players
Expatriate footballers in Poland
German expatriate sportspeople in Poland
Association football defenders